Syed Kamal or simply called Kamal ((27 April 1937 – 1 October 2009) was a Pakistani film and TV actor, producer and director. He had worked in 4 Bollywood films before migrating to Pakistan in 1956.

Popular in the 60s and the 70s, he worked in some 120 films.

Early life and career
Syed Kamal was born in Meerut, Uttar Pradesh, British India on 27 April 1937.
Syed Kamal was a popular film star in the 1960s and the 1970s. Kamal, whose film Tauba (1963)  became a success at the box office, had a striking resemblance to the Indian filmstar Raj Kapoor, and he was not evasive about this issue. He once said, "People used to mistake me for Raj Kapoor while I was in Bombay and I enjoyed it".  In fact, according to Pakistani script writer Ali Sufyan Afaqi, Kamal used to practice Raj Kapoor's scenes in front of a mirror. Kamal's first appearance in his Pakistani movie by producer Shabab Keranvi Thandi Sarak (1957) was meant to resemble Raj Kapoor.

Achievements and awards
 Syed Kamal won a Special Nigar Award (Special Award) for film Behan Bhai (1968) 
Special Nigar Award (Lifetime Achievement Award) in 2000.

Among his other activities, he founded the Karachi Film Guild and Pakistan Film and TV Academy.

After retirement from films, he began acting in Pakistan Television dramas at a fairly advanced age. His most notable TV appearance is in hit TV drama Kashkol in which he played a wealthy businessman whose son (played by his real life son, Ghalib Kamal) becomes addicted to heroin.

Death and legacy
Syed Kamal died on 1 October 2009 at Karachi after a lingering illness at age 72. He had been a heart patient for many years and had fallen accidentally at his home about a month ago. He was bedridden since his fall. His survivors include his wife, his son Ghalib Kamal and three daughters.

Paying tributes to Syed Kamal, the president of Hum TV, Sultana Siddiqui said that Syed Kamal belonged to a respectable family and had encouraged many people to join the Pakistan film industry.
Film script writer Pervaiz Kaleem, film director Aslam Dar, actress Babra Sharif and actor Ghulam Mohiuddin also paid their tributes to Syed Kamal.

Filmography

As an actor
Thandi Sarak (1957)
Sawera (1959)
Apna Paraya (1959)
Banjaran (1962)
Tauba (1963)
Aashiana (1964)
Aisa Bhi Hota Hai (1965)
Behan Bhai (1968)
Nai Laila Naya Majnoon (1969) (a platinum jubilee film
Road To Swat (1970)
Insan Aur Gadha (1973)

As a director
Shehnai (1968) starring (Syed Kamal-Deeba) 
Insan Aur Gadha (1973) starring (Syed Kamal-Nisho-Rozina)
Yahan Say Wahan Tak starring (Syed Kamal-Mumtaz)
Honeymoon (1970) starring (Syed Kamal-Husna-Rozina)
Roop Behroop starring (producer-director-actor Syed Kamal opposite Nisho)
Doosri Maan starring (Syed Kamal-Shamim Ara)
Meray Bacchay Meri Aankhein starring (Syed Kamal-Deeba)
Dard-E-Dil starring (Syed Kamal and Zeba)
Aaliya starring (Syed Kamal and Shamim Ara)
Jatt Kurrian Taun Darda (1976) A Punjabi film, starring Syed Kamal, Neelo and Aslam Pervaiz
Ajj Dian Kurrian (1977) A Punjabi film, starring Syed Kamal and Neelo
Kal De Munday (1978)
Jat Kamala Gaya Dubai (1984)
Siyasat (1986)

See also 
 List of Lollywood actors

References

External links
 

1937 births
2009 deaths
People from Meerut
Muhajir people
Pakistani male film actors
Pakistani male television actors
Pakistani film directors
Pakistani film producers
Pakistani politicians
Male actors from Karachi
Nigar Award winners